Raymond Tong (born 3 February 1942) is an English former professional footballer who played as a left winger.

Career
Born in Bolton, Tong spent his early career with Bury, Blackburn Rovers and Bradford City. He signed for Bradford City in June 1963, and made 20 league and 1 Football League Cup appearances for the club, before retiring in 1965.

Sources

References

1942 births
Living people
English footballers
Bury F.C. players
Blackburn Rovers F.C. players
Bradford City A.F.C. players
English Football League players
Association football wingers